was a Japanese mathematics educator, born in Kōchi Prefecture, Japan. He graduated from the College of Science at Osaka University with a degree in mathematics and taught high school mathematics in his home town of Osaka. In 1954, his son, Takeshi,  performed poorly in a Year 2 mathematics test. Prompted by his wife, Teiko, Toru closely examined Takeshi's textbooks and believed they lacked the proper opportunity for a child to practice and master a topic. As a result, he began to handwrite worksheets each day for his son. By the time Takeshi was in Year 6, he was able to solve differential and integral calculus usually seen in the final years of high school. This was the beginning of the Kumon Method of Learning.

As a result of Takeshi's progress, other parents became interested in Kumon's ideas, and in 1955,  the first Kumon Center was opened in Osaka, Japan. In 1958, Toru Kumon founded the Kumon Institute of Education, which set the standards for the Kumon Centers that began to open around the world. 

The Kumon Programs are designed to strengthen a student's fundamental maths and language skills by studying worksheets tailored to a student's ability. The method also aims for students to learn independently and to study advanced material beyond their school grade level.  

Students progress once they demonstrate mastery of a topic. Kumon defined mastery as being able to achieve an excellent score on the material in a given time. Kumon strongly emphasised the concepts of time and accuracy.

Even in his later years, Toru Kumon gave lectures on his method of learning including the importance of having students learn material that is suited to their ability and not their age and the benefits of allowing students to learn material well ahead of their grade level.

Toru Kumon died in Osaka on July 25, 1995 at the age of 81 from pneumonia. There is a Toru Kumon museum in Osaka, Japan and a Kumon Foundation Day celebrated on October 20 each year. Asteroid 3569 Kumon is named after him.

References 

1914 births
1995 deaths
Japanese educational theorists
20th-century Japanese mathematicians
People from Kōchi Prefecture
Osaka University alumni